Nucleoporin 153 (Nup153) is a protein which in humans is encoded by the NUP153 gene. It is an essential component of the basket of nuclear pore complexes (NPCs) in vertebrates, and required for the anchoring of NPCs. It also acts as the docking site of an importing karyopherin. On the cytoplasmic side of the NPC, Nup358 fulfills an analogous role.

Background 

Nuclear pore complexes are extremely elaborate structures that mediate the regulated movement of macromolecules between the nucleus and cytoplasm. These complexes are composed of at least 100 different polypeptide subunits, many of which belong to the nucleoporin family. Nucleoporins are pore complex-specific glycoproteins characterized by cytoplasmically oriented O-linked N-acetylglucosamine residues and numerous repeats of the pentapeptide sequence XFXFG.

Structure 
Nucleoporin 153 has a mass of 153 kDA (hence its name). It is filamentous and it contains three distinct domains: a N-terminal region within which a pore targeting domain has been identified, a central region containing multiple zinc finger motifs, and a C-terminal region containing multiple XFXFG repeats.

Interactions
NUP153 has been shown to interact with SENP2 and KPNB1.

References

Further reading

Nuclear pore complex